Mestawet Ethiopian Newspaper is one of the monthly magazines for the Ethiopian immigrant community in the United States. It started with 150 copies on April 1, 2001, in the Twin Cities and now distributes 80,000 copies it to audiences nationwide. Cities the newspaper can be found are Los Angeles, Seattle, Washington DC, Dallas, Denver, Atlanta, Columbus, South Dakota, Minneapolis & Saint Paul and Portland.

The Editor in Chief of the newspaper is Moges Kebede.

The newspaper is primary language is in the Amharic language, the official language of Ethiopia.

African culture in Minnesota
Ethiopian-American history
Newspapers published in Minnesota